The , often abbreviated as Shūishū, is the third imperial anthology of waka from Heian period Japan. It was compiled by Emperor Kazan in about 1005. Its twenty volumes contain 1,351 poems.  The details of its publication and compilation are unclear.

Until the early nineteenth century, it was mistakenly believed that the Shūishō was a selection of the best poems from the Shūishū, and so the former was more highly regarded.

References

Bibliography 
Cranston, Edwin A., 1993. A Waka Anthology, Volume Two: Grasses of Remembrance. Palo Alto : Stanford University Press. .
Keene, Donald, 1999. Seeds in the Heart: A History of Japanese Literature, Volume 1. New York: Columbia University Press. .

Japanese poetry anthologies
Late Old Japanese texts
1000s in Japan
Buddhist poetry
1000s books